The UMW Holdings Berhad is one of the largest companies and also one of the leading industrial enterprises, serving the economies of Malaysia and the Asia-Pacific region. The UMW Group is an RM11 billion company and ranks among the foremost corporations listed on the Bursa Malaysia. Its net assets exceed RM2.3 billion and its workforce numbers more than 7,500 employees serving customers through a nationwide distribution network.

Subsidiaries

Automotive
UMW Toyota Motor Sdn. Bhd. 
Assembly Services Sdn. Bhd.
Automotive Industries Sdn. Bhd.
Toyota Boshoku UMW Sdn. Bhd.

Associate Company
Perusahaan Otomobil Kedua Sdn. Bhd. (Perodua)

Equipment
UMW Equipment Sdn. Bhd.
UMW (East Malaysia) Sdn. Bhd.
UMW Niugini Limited, Papua New Guinea
UMW Engineering Services Limited, Myanmar
UMW Industries (1985) Sdn. Bhd.
UMW Equipment & Engineering Pte. Ltd.
UMW Equipment Systems (Vietnam) Company Limited, Vietnam
UMW Material Handling Shanghai Group, China 
UMW Industrial Trading (Shanghai) Co. Ltd
UMW Industrial Equipment Co. Ltd.
Vision Fleet Equipment Leasing (Shanghai) Co. Ltd.
UMW Industrial Power Sdn. Bhd.

Manufacturing and engineering
UMW Aerospace Sdn. Bhd.
UMW Aero Assets Sdn. Bhd.
UMW Grantt International Sdn. Bhd. (Grantt)
UMW Lubricant International Sdn. Bhd. (Repsol)
UMW Pennzoil Distributors Sdn. Bhd. (Pennzoil)
Lubetech Sdn. Bhd.
Lubritech International Holdings Ltd.
UMW Advantech Sdn. Bhd.
KYB-UMW Malaysia Sdn. Bhd.
join venture with Perodua

References

External links
 Official website
 DinarStandard

Manufacturing companies based in Kuala Lumpur
Companies listed on Bursa Malaysia
Government-owned companies of Malaysia
Conglomerate companies established in 1917
Permodalan Nasional Berhad
Conglomerate companies of Malaysia
1917 establishments in British Malaya
Malaysian brands